Sempre Vivas National Park is a national park in the state of Minas Gerais, Brazil.

Location

The park is in the Cerrado biome.
It was created on 13 December 2002 and is administered by the Chico Mendes Institute for Biodiversity Conservation.
It covers parts of the municipalities of Bocaiúva, Buenópolis, Diamantina and Olhos-d'Água in Minais Gerais.
The park became part of the Espinhaço Mosaic of conservation units, created in 2010.

Environment

The park is in the Serras do Espinhaço Meridional.
It forms part of the watershed between the Jequitinhonha River and São Francisco River, which it feeds from about 600 springs.

The park has well-preserved examples of varied types of vegetation including cerrado woodland and fields, seasonal semi-deciduous forest, swamp forest, streams, lagoons and riparian vegetation.
These support a wide range of plant species.
There are four endemic species of amphibians: Bokermannohyla saxicola, Lanceback Treefrog (Scinax curicica), Pseudopaludicola mineira and Thoropa megatympanum.
There are two endemic bird species: hyacinth visorbearer (Augastes scutatus) and grey-backed tachuri (Polystictus superciliaris).

Conservation

The park is classified as IUCN protected area category II (national park).
It has the objectives of preserving natural ecosystems of great ecological relevance and scenic beauty, enabling scientific research, environmental education, outdoors recreation and eco-tourism.
Protected species include the maned wolf (Chrysocyon brachyurus), cougar (Puma concolor), ocelot (Leopardus pardalis), giant anteater (Myrmecophaga tridactyla) and giant armadillo (Priodontes maximus).

Notes

Sources

2002 establishments in Brazil
National parks of Brazil
Protected areas of Minas Gerais
Cerrado